Mariana Cherdivara-Eșanu (born 15 September 1992) is a Moldovan freestyle wrestler. She competed in the women's freestyle 58 kg event at the 2016 Summer Olympics, in which she was eliminated in the round of 16 by Sakshi Malik.

In 2020, she won the silver medal in the women's 59 kg event at the 2020 Individual Wrestling World Cup held in Belgrade, Serbia. In March 2021, she competed at the European Qualification Tournament in Budapest, Hungary hoping to qualify for the 2020 Summer Olympics in Tokyo, Japan. She did not qualify at this tournament and she also failed to qualify for the Olympics at the World Olympic Qualification Tournament held in Sofia, Bulgaria.

Major results

References

External links
 

1992 births
Living people
Moldovan female sport wrestlers
Olympic wrestlers of Moldova
Wrestlers at the 2016 Summer Olympics
Wrestlers at the 2015 European Games
Wrestlers at the 2019 European Games
European Games competitors for Moldova
European Wrestling Championships medalists
21st-century Moldovan women